Race results from the automobile and motorcycle races contested at the Indianapolis Motor Speedway in Speedway, Indiana. Races have been held on seven different track configurations:

 Oval (1909–present): 2.500 miles; 4 turns; counter-clockwise
 Automobile Road Course (2000–2007): 2.605 miles; 13 turns; clockwise
 Motorcycle Road Course (2008–2013): 2.621 miles; 16 turns; counter-clockwise
 Automobile Road Course (2009–2013): 2.534 miles; 13 turns; clockwise
 Automobile Road Course INDYCAR GP Version (2014–present): 2.439 miles; 14 turns; clockwise
 Automobile Road Course SCCA Runoffs Version (2014–present):  2.589 miles;  15 turns;  clockwise
 Motorcycle Road Course (2014–present): 2.591 miles; 16 turns; counter-clockwise.
 Dirt Track (2018–present):  0.200 miles;  4 turns;  counter-clockwise.

Automobile races – oval

Prest-O-Lite Trophy, Wheeler-Schebler Trophy, and other early automobile races (1909–1910)
On four race weekends in 1909 and 1910, a total of 82 automobile races were held, with lengths varying between 5 and 250 miles. Of these, 17 were of distance of 20 miles or more. None of the short races served as a qualifying race, or "heat" race, for the longer events. Each race stood on its own, and awarded its own trophy. All 82 races were sanctioned by the American Automobile Association (AAA). The 1909 races took place on the original crushed stone and tar surface. As the weekend progressed, the track surface began breaking up badly, and the final race of the weekend, scheduled for a 300-mile length, was shortened to 235 miles. The next scheduled weekend of auto races, planned for early October, was canceled so the track could be repaved in brick during the fall of 1909. Over two days in December, several automobile and motorcycle racers conducted speed exhibitions, in extremely cold temperatures. No races had been planned for that event. The next races were run over three holiday weekends in 1910.

Indianapolis 500 (since 1911)
The Indianapolis 500, introduced as the International 500-Mile Sweepstakes in 1911, has been held on Memorial Day, or the Memorial Day weekend, every year since (excluding six years during the World Wars). In 2020, due to the 2019-20 coronavirus pandemic, the race was postponed to August. The race has been sanctioned by the American Automobile Association (AAA) from 1911 to 1955, by the United States Automobile Club (USAC) from 1956 to 1997, and by the Indy Racing League (IRL) from 1998 to the present.

Harvest Auto Racing Classic (1916)
The Harvest Auto Racing Classic was a series of three races, of 20, 50, and 100 mile lengths, held in September 1916. The event was sanctioned by the American Automobile Association (AAA), and the 100 mile feature race counted toward the 1916 AAA National Championship.

Brickyard 400 (1994–2020)
The Brickyard 400 is an annual stock car race that is part of NASCAR Cup Series. This event, when first held in 1994, marked the first race other than the Indianapolis 500 to be held at the Indianapolis Motor Speedway since 1916. From 2005 to 2009, the race was known as the Allstate 400 at the Brickyard, under a naming rights arrangement with Allstate Insurance. From 2012 to 2016, the race was known as the Crown Royal Presents the (Your Hero's Name Here) 400 at the Brickyard, under the naming rights arrangement with Diageo, which included an annual contest in which the winner would have his/her name attached to the race. The race remains commonly known as the Brickyard 400.

In 2018, the race was moved from its summer date to early September, serving as the final race before the NASCAR playoffs. Two years later, the 400 switched places with Daytona International Speedway's Coke Zero Sugar 400 to become the Cup Series' Independence Day weekend round.

The race shifted to the infield road course in 2021.

Note: In 2004, 2015, 2016 and 2020, the race was extended due to a green-white-checker finish. The 2016 race took two attempts.

IROC at Indy (1998–2003)
The IROC at Indy race was held as support to the Brickyard 400. It was part of the International Race of Champions series, and was the IROC season finale for all six years it was held. All participating cars: Pontiac.

Freedom 100 (2003–2019)
The Freedom 100 was a Firestone Indy Lights race, held as support to the Indianapolis 500.

Indiana 250 (2012–2019)
The Indiana 250 is a NASCAR Xfinity Series race which, starting in 2012, is held as part of the "Super Weekend at the Brickyard" event. It replaced the Kroger 200, which had been held at nearby Lucas Oil Raceway (formerly Indianapolis Raceway Park) in Clermont, Indiana.

Automobile races – road course

United States Grand Prix at Indianapolis (2000–2007)
Beginning in 2000, the United States Grand Prix at Indianapolis, a round of the Formula One World Championship, was held on a combined road course, utilizing part of the oval and a new infield segment. The first running was widely popular, and marked the return of Formula One to the United States for the first time since 1991.

During the 2005 Formula One season, a rule mandated all cars must run an entire (305 km / 190 miles) race on one set of tires, and there was a tire war between Bridgestone and Michelin during the season. That led to controversy when two crashes in practice took place with Michelin-shod cars because of tire failure, especially with the high g-loads through turns 12 and 13. On race morning, all cars utilizing Michelin tires withdrew from the race on the formation lap due to safety concerns and the rules in question at the time. The controversy tarnished the event, angered fans and media, and led to costly ticket refunds.

The event recovered, with successful races held in 2006 and 2007, but crowds never matched the year 2000 attendance. After the contract expired in 2007, an agreement could not be reached to hold the race in 2008. A future return to Indianapolis had been rumored, but was always denied. Speedway officials claimed they made profit on the first four runnings, but lost money on the last four runnings. After the announcement of a new United States Grand Prix in Austin, and management and schedule changes at the Speedway, a return of Formula One is highly unlikely.

Porsche Supercup (2000–2006)
The Porsche Supercup series held twin races, as support to the United States Grand Prix. On September 23, 2000, by winning the first of two races, Bernd Maylander earned the distinction of becoming the first driver to win a race of any kind on the Indianapolis Motor Speedway road course. All participating cars: Porsche.

Ferrari Challenge (2000–2002, 2019–)
The Ferrari Challenge series held races, as support to the first three United States Grand Prix events. Beginning in 2019, the championship returned to IMS with a stand-alone event, featuring four races over two series.  All participating cars: Ferrari.

Formula BMW (2004–2007)
The Formula BMW USA series held twin races, as support to the United States Grand Prix.

Liberty Challenge (2005–2007)
The Liberty Challenge was an Indy Pro Series race, held as support to the United States Grand Prix. In 2007, twin races were held. All participating cars: Dallara/Infiniti.

Porsche Carrera Cup North America (2007, 2021–)
The Porsche Carrera Cup North America, which replaced the IMSA GT3 Cup Challenge in 2021, holds twin races. It was held as support to the United States Grand Prix in 2007. All participating cars: Porsche 911 GT3 Cup.

Battle on the Bricks (2012–2014, 2023–)
The Battle on the Bricks (as of 2023), originally the Brickyard Grand Prix from 2012–14, is an IMSA WeatherTech SportsCar Championship event with multiple classes being run concurrently. The original version, held from 2012–14, was in support of the Brickyard 400, as part of the "Kroger Super Weekend at the Brickyard" event. In its first two years, it was held as part of the Grand Am Rolex Sports Car Series, and moved to the United SportsCar Championship in 2014.  The 2023 race will be held in September, again with the WeatherTech SportsCar Championship as a three-hour race (2 hours, 40 minute race length for the three-hour distance) on NBC. For 2024, the race will expand to an endurance race and be one of the major endurance races on the IMSA schedule, joining Daytona, Sebring, Watkins Glen, and Petit Le Mans.

Brickyard Sports Car Challenge (2012–2014, 2023–)
The Brickyard Sports Car Challenge is a sports car race in the IMSA Michelin Pilot Challenge series, with two classes being run concurrently. It was held as support to the Brickyard Grand Prix, which was in turn a support race to the Brickyard 400.  The 2023 revival will be one of IMSA's major races, as a four-hour race.

Grand Prix of Indianapolis (since 2014)
The Grand Prix of Indianapolis is an IndyCar Series race, held as a lead-in event to the Indianapolis 500.

Indy NXT (2014–2019, 2021–)
The Indy NXT series holds twin races, as support to the Grand Prix of Indianapolis. Unlike other races conducted by this series at this track (Freedom 100 and Liberty Challenge), these races were not named.

USF Pro 2000 (since 2014)
The USF Pro 2000 Championship holds multiple races, as support to the Grand Prix of Indianapolis. All cars 2014-2017 Élan / Mazda, 2018 onwards Tatuus / Mazda.

1 This race was originally scheduled as the second race at NOLA Motorsports Park, on April 12. The starting grid was determined by qualifications and results of Race 1 at NOLA. The race was rescheduled to May 7 at IMS because of inclement weather at NOLA.

USF 2000 (since 2014)
The USF 2000 Championship holds multiple races, as support to the Grand Prix of Indianapolis. All cars 2014 to 2016: Élan / Mazda; 2017 to present Tatuus / Mazda.

Brickyard Vintage Racing Invitational (2014–2019, 2022–)
The Brickyard Vintage Racing Invitational is a series of races for various classes of vintage racing automobiles. The event is sanctioned by the Sportscar Vintage Racing Association.  The event returned in 2022 after a two year absence.

Event Grand Marshalls
2014: Parnelli Jones
2015: Al Unser Sr.
2016: Donald Davidson
2017: Bobby Unser
2018: Johnny Rutherford
2019: Lyn St. James

Formula 4 United States Championship (2017)
The Formula 4 United States Championship held twin races as support to Sportscar Vintage Racing Association sanctioned racing. All participating cars: Crawford / Honda

Trans-Am Series (2017–2019, 2023–)
The Trans-Am Series held twin races, with the TA2 class competing in one while the remaining classes ran concurrently in the other. When the series returned in 2023 after a three year absence, the TA2 race was dropped. It is held in support of the Brickyard Vintage Racing Invitational. The 2018 event was run in conjunction with the Trans-Am West Coast Championship.

Global MX-5 Cup (2017, 2020)
The Global MX-5 Cup held twin races, as support to the Brickyard Vintage Racing Invitational in 2017 and the IndyCar Harvest Grand Prix in 2020. All participating cars: Spec Miata.

SCCA National Championship Runoffs (2017, 2021)
The SCCA National Championship Runoffs is a series of end-of-year championship races for various classes of automobiles. One of the largest annual gatherings of amateur road racing drivers in the world, the event is sanctioned by the Sports Car Club of America and frequently rotates venues.

Pennzoil 150 (since 2020)
The Xfinity Series' Pennzoil 150 has been held on the track's infield road course after being moved from the oval in 2020.

Indianapolis 8 Hours (since 2020)
The Indianapolis 8 Hours is a GT class sports car endurance race held by the Intercontinental GT Challenge series, in conjunction with the GT World Challenge America series.

NOTE:  The 2021 race was run on the  layout used by the SCCA Runoffs, and not the  layout as used by INDYCAR because of kerbing damage from the NASCAR meeting.

GT4 America Series (since 2020)
The GT4 America Series holds twin races, as support to the Indianapolis 8 Hours. After the 2020 season, the Sprint and SprintX classifications were abolished.

TC America Series (since 2020)
The TC America Series holds twin races, as support to the Indianapolis 8 Hours.

Gallagher Grand Prix (since 2020)
The Gallagher Grand Prix, the second IndyCar Series event held annually on the road course, was originally the Harvest Grand Prix when first organised in 2020 as two IndyCar Series races, scheduled as part of revisions to the 2020 IndyCar Series calendar due to the 2019-20 coronavirus pandemic. These races were also held as support to the Indianapolis 8 Hours. Although the name paid tribute to the Harvest Auto Racing Classic, these events are unrelated.

The secondary IndyCar race was moved to the NASCAR weekend in 2021, as part of the Verizon 200 at the Brickyard weekend. The idea of pairing IndyCar and NASCAR was initially part of changes caused by the pandemic in 2020 before being made permanent.

Verizon 200 at the Brickyard (since 2021)
The NASCAR Cup Series Verizon 200 at the Brickyard has been held annually on track's infield road course after being moved from the oval in 2021, creating a three-race weekend on the road course.

2021 and 2022: Race extended due to NASCAR Overtime.

GT America Series (since 2021)
The GT America Series holds twin races, as support to the Indianapolis 8 Hours.

Motorcycle races – oval

National Motorcycle Race Meet (1909)
The first motorsports event at the track consisted of 7 motorcycle races, ranging from 1 to 10 miles in length, on August 14, 1909. All races were sanctioned by the Federation of American Motorcyclists (FAM). A planned feature race of 25 miles was canceled, as was a proposed second day of competition, due to concerns over suitability of track surface for motorcycle use.

Motorcycle races – road course

Red Bull Indianapolis GP (2008–2015)
Beginning in 2008, the Red Bull Indianapolis GP, a round of the FIM's MotoGP World Championship motorcycle series, was held on a variation of the road course, modified for motorcycle competition.

FIM Moto2 (2008–2015)
As is true of most MotoGP Road Racing World Championship events, the secondary class was included as support to the Red Bull Indianapolis GP. Until the end of the 2009 season, the class was designated as the 250cc series, based upon its engine capacity (250cc two-stroke engines). Starting in 2010, the class was renamed Moto2, following new FIM nomenclature and formula (600cc four-stroke engines).

FIM Moto3 (2008–2015)
As is true of most MotoGP Road Racing World Championship events, the tertiary class was included as support to the Red Bull Indianapolis GP. Until the end of the 2011 season, the class was designated as the 125cc series, based upon its engine capacity (125cc, two-stroke engines). Starting in 2012, the class was renamed Moto3, following new FIM nomenclature and formula (250cc, four-stroke).

NOTES: Applying to the above three classes.

1 All races in the 2008 Red Bull Indianapolis Grand Prix were affected by high winds and heavy rain. The 125cc and MotoGP races were shortened, while the 250cc race was canceled.

2 Race shortened by crash.

Red Bull Rookies Cup (2008)
The Red Bull AMA Rookies Cup was an entry level series for young riders, held as support features primarily at AMA Superbike events. It was the US counterpart to the Red Bull MotoGP Rookies Cup, a similar series held as support features at European MotoGP events. The Red Bull Riders Cup was an all-star event combining the leading riders in the AMA Rookies Cup and MotoGP Rookies Cup series. The Red Bull AMA Rookies Cup and Red Bull Riders Cup each held a race, as support to the Red Bull Indianapolis GP. All participating motorcycles: KTM.

USGPRU Moriwaki MD250H (2010)
The Moriwaki MD250H series is an entry level category for young riders, sanctioned by the United States Grand Prix Racers Union. The series held twin races, as support to the Red Bull Indianapolis GP. All participating motorcycles: Moriwaki chassis with Honda engines.

AMA Pro Vance and Hines XR1200 (2011–2014)
The Pro Vance & Hines XR1200 series, sanctioned by AMA Pro Road Racing, held twin races, as support to the Red Bull Indianapolis GP. All participating motorcycles: Harley-Davidson XR1200.

FIM eRoadRacing North American Regional Series (2013)
The North American series of the FIM eRoadRacing World Cup, a championship of electric motorcycle road racing, held a race as support to the Red Bull Indianapolis GP.

MotoAmerica Superbike and Superstock 1000 (2015, 2020)
The MotoAmerica Superbike Championship ran two races, each with two classes being run concurrently, as support to the Red Bull Indianapolis GP. The Superstock 1000 class was abolished after 2017. In 2020, the series was originally scheduled to return as part of Motorcycles on Meridian. Because of the Indianapolis 500 being rescheduled for the Meridian weekend, the races occurred in mid-October with limited number of spectators.

MotoAmerica Supersport (2015, 2020)
The MotoAmerica Supersport series held a race as support to the Red Bull Indianapolis GP. In 2020, the series was originally scheduled to return as part of Motorcycles on Meridian. After Motorcycles on Meridian was canceled due to the 2019-20 coronavirus pandemic, the races occurred anyway in front of a limited number of spectators.

MotoAmerica Stock 1000 (2020)
The MotoAmerica Stock 1000 series race was originally scheduled as a companion event to Motorcycles on Meridian in 2020. After Motorcycles on Meridian was canceled due to the 2019-20 coronavirus pandemic, the race occurred anyway in front of a limited number of spectators. This series was effectively the replacement of the Superstock 1000 class, with slight differences.

MotoAmerica Twins Cup (2020)
The MotoAmerica Twins Cup series race was originally scheduled as a companion event to Motorcycles on Meridian in 2020. After Motorcycles on Meridian was canceled due to the 2019-20 coronavirus pandemic, the race occurred anyway in front of a limited number of spectators.

MotoAmerica Liqui Moly Junior Cup (2020)
The MotoAmerica Liqui Moly Junior Cup series races were originally scheduled as a companion event to Motorcycles on Meridian in 2020. After Motorcycles on Meridian was canceled due to the 2019-20 coronavirus pandemic, the races occurred anyway in front of a limited number of spectators. This series is an entry level class exclusively designated for riders younger than 25 years old.

Dirt Track

Bryan Clauson Classic (2018–2019, 2021–)

In 2018, the Speedway added a .200 mile dirt track near Turn 3. It hosts an annual United States Auto Club-sanctioned midget invitational event, the Bryan Clauson Classic, featuring two races, the Stoops Pursuit and the Driven2SaveLives BC39.

The Stoops Pursuit is a 25-lap elimination race split into five stages of five green flag laps each. Eliminations occur when a car stops and causes a safety car at any time, and at the end of each stage, any car that lost track position or the last place driver. The winner winner earns $1,500 plus an extra $100 for each position gained.

The Driven2SaveLives BC39 is a 39-lap race, with a winner's prize of $15,000. The starting field is based on heat race results and passing points.

NOTE:  The 2019 Stoops Pursuit was scored as of 24 laps because the red flag waved on the final lap and two cars were stalled after collisions, leaving just one car running at the end of the event.

Race win milestones

Multiple victories
41 participants (38 drivers and 3 motorcycle riders) have each won three or more races at the Indianapolis Motor Speedway:

First winners

Other automotive exhibitions

Brick track re-opening (1909) 
After the original track surface of crushed stone and tar proved unsuitable, during the August 1909 races, the decision was made to re-pave the track with brick. Once that was completed, and a retaining wall added, a two-day time trial session was conducted. Ten drivers and riders drove partial laps alone, attempting speed records at various distances of one mile and less. In addition, there was one 20-mile free-for-all session, with seven cars running concurrently. Finally, Lewis Strang drove a two-lap session. Although no races were held, or planned, the public was admitted, and programs were sold.

Indianapolis Auto Show Stunt Driving Competition (1910)
Several weeks before its first auto races of 1910, the Speedway held a special competition, in conjunction with the Indianapolis Auto Show. Six stunts were attempted while driving, including popping balloons with the wheels, and balancing the car on a teeter board. Most of the stunts required the participation of a passenger, such as dropping a potato into a basket, and holding a rubber ball in a spoon. At least two of the participants were professional race drivers (Harry Endicott and Johnny Aitken). The winner apparently was not, as his name does not appear in available race statistics of the day. The drivers in this event also included Katrina Fertig, making her the first woman to drive in a competition (though not in a race, as such) at the Indianapolis Motor Speedway.

Hazard Race (1910)
The second day of the May, 1910, race weekend started with a special event, a "Hazard Race." Each car went out separately, driving over portable ramps on the track, into the creek in the infield, under the track, into the parking lot, across the automobile bridge over the track, and eventually back onto the track. The total distance was a bit over a lap, and the winner was determined by the best time.

Private race: Union Printers' National Baseball League (1916)
In August 1916, the Union Printers' National Baseball League held its annual tournament in Indianapolis. A special event for the entertainment of tournament participants was a day of exhibition automobile races held at the Indianapolis Motor Speedway Because the races were not part of a recognized series, and were conducted for a private audience, this is not generally regarded as an official race event.

Private race: American Society for Steel Treating Convention (1921)
In September 1921, the American Society for Steel Treating held its annual convention in Indianapolis. A special event during this convention was an exhibition automobile race held at the Indianapolis Motor Speedway Because this race was not part of a recognized series, and was for a private audience, it is not generally regarded as an official race event.

Stevens Challenge Trophy (1927–1954)
Beginning in 1927, The Samuel B. Stevens Challenge Trophy was offered to any automobile manufacturer to run a strictly stock, production automobile at the Indianapolis Motor Speedway, for a period of
24 hours at an average speed of 60 miles per hour or more. This was not a race as such, as only one team participated in any instance. Four manufactures earned the trophy over the next 27 years. The trophy was retired after Chrysler's win in 1954.

Ford made an unsuccessful run 1956 with drivers Johnny Mantz, Chuck Stevenson, Chuck Davis, and Danny Ames. Though they failed to complete the 24 hours, they did set a 500-mile stock car record at the Speedway of 111.916 mph.

Nichels Engineering Endurance Run (1961)
In 1961, Ray Nichels, then a successful builder of race cars, prepared two production-based Pontiacs for a 24-hour endurance run at the Indianapolis Motor Speedway. He assembled six drivers, three from USAC and three from NASCAR, taking turns in both cars.

Pit Stop Challenge (1977–2019, 2022–)
The Pit Stop Challenge is a pit stop contest held during activities leading up to the Indianapolis 500. Since 1977, the event has been held on Carb Day, following the final practice session.

NOTE: No event was held in 2008 because of rain, or in 2020 and 2021 due to coronavirus pandemic.

Stadium Super Trucks (2014)
In 2014, the Stadium Super Trucks, officially known as Speed Energy Formula Off-Road, held a doubleheader event on a small modified course at the northwest corner of the track. This incorporated a portion of the oval track's pit entry, two small portions of the road course, a segment of an access lane, and dirt areas in between, with two jump ramps added. This occurred during the Indy 500's Carb Day activities, and marked the first time in track history that trucks were raced. Series founder Robby Gordon had tested at the track in April.

Indy Autonomous Challenge (2021)
In 2021, a race to determine the winner of the Indy Autonomous Challenge was held on the oval using full-scale autonomous race cars based on identical Dallara Indy Lights chassis supplied by Juncos Racing. The event was composed exclusively of teams from academic institutions, which were required to develop their own self-driving software.

References

Motorsport competitions in the United States
Motor Speedway race results
Race results at motorsport venues